Hinckley and Bosworth is a local government district with borough status in south-western Leicestershire, England, administered by Hinckley and Bosworth Borough Council. Its only towns are Hinckley, Earl Shilton and Market Bosworth. Villages include Barwell, Burbage, Stoke Golding, Groby, Shackerstone and Twycross. The population of the Borough at the 2011 census was 105,078.

As of the 2019 local election, the council is controlled by the Liberal Democrats.

The district is broadly coterminous to the Bosworth parliamentary constituency, which is represented in Parliament by Luke Evans (Conservative).

The Borough was formed in 1974 by the merger of the Hinckley Urban District and the Market Bosworth Rural District less Ibstock. It was originally to be known as Bosworth, but the council changed its name on 20 November 1973, before it came into its powers. It was granted borough status in 1974.

Geography
There are a number of geographical features which shape the landscape of Hinckley & Bosworth.

Two large neighbouring urban areas lie to the south of the borough: Hinckley and Burbage and Barwell and Earl Shilton. A narrow green wedge separates the two conurbations, which is increasingly being occupied by leisure facilities such as the Marston's Stadium and a new leisure centre. To the east of the wedge lies Burbage Common and Woods, a large popular green recreational area.

The west of the borough is largely flat in nature, dominated by the River Sence flood plain. This area of the borough is largely rural, consisting of a number of very small villages and hamlets.

At the northern and eastern edges of the borough lie several settlements (including Bagworth, Desford, Groby, Markfield, Ratby and Thornton) which largely relate to Leicester; in particular the most northern villages have little to do with the main administrative centre of Hinckley. The northern area of the borough also forms part of Charnwood Forest, an area which it is hoped can be enhanced to provide an attractive natural resource.

Places of interest

 The Geographical Centre of England is in the northwest of the borough at Lindley Hall Farm, near Fenny Drayton
 Burbage Common and Woods is one of the largest recreation areas in the borough consisting of 80 hectares of fields, meadows and woodland
 Hinckley Museum is in a range of 17th century timber-framed framework knitters' cottages.
 The Ashby Canal, the longest contour canal in England, passes through the borough from Hinckley in the south of the borough through Stoke Golding, Dadlington, Market Bosworth and Shackerstone before heading north to its current terminus at Snarestone.
 There is a large mill in Sheepy Magna to the west of the borough located on the River Sence
 Stoke Golding has one of the most beautiful medieval churches in Leicestershire, with an exquisitely carved arcade and very fine 13th century window tracery.
 The site of the Battle of Bosworth, administered by Leicestershire County Council, includes an interpretation centre at Ambion Hill, where Richard III encamped the night before the battle. St. James's Church at Dadlington is the place where many of the dead were buried and where a chantry was founded on their behalf.
 The Battlefield Line is a preserved railway which runs over part of the alignment of the former railway from Nuneaton to Ashby-de-la-Zouch. It is home to the Shackerstone Diesel Group.
 Twycross Zoo is notable for having the largest collection of primates in the world.
 Thornton Reservoir is a former  drinking water reservoir that is no longer in use.
 A large collection of tropical birds is on display at Tropical Birdland near to Desford.

Railways
The only railway station in the borough on the National Rail network is Hinckley railway station on the South Leicestershire Line opened by the LNWR between 1862 and 1864. Currently there are direct services to Birmingham New Street and Leicester only with additional services to/from Cambridge and Stansted Airport in the peak.

There was also a branch line serving the market town of Market Bosworth which connected both Nuneaton and Hinckley to both Coalville and Ashby. The line closed to regular traffic in 1970 and is now part of the Battlefield Line. There was also a small stub to Hinckley but was never opened or used. There was also a stub to Nuneaton via Stoke Golding.

The last line that runs through part the borough is the Leicester to Burton Line which had a station in Desford, the station closed in 1964 but the line remains open for traffic. The station also served as a junction for the branch line to Leicester West Bridge on the now defunct Swannington and Leicester Railway. Although the section from Desford to Swannington remains open for freight traffic.

Demographics

Hinckley and Bosworth is the second largest borough by population in Leicestershire and has seen significant population growth over recent decades; a trend forecast to continue at least into the short-medium term.

Political control

Like many other shire districts, authority over Hinckley and Bosworth is shared between the district council and the county council. Areas of responsibility of the district council include local planning, building control, council housing, refuse collection, recycling, and some leisure services and parks.

The district council is made up of 34 councillors who are elected every four years; the last election took place in May 2019. The council is currently under control of the Liberal Democrats who took control from the Conservatives at that election.

The current composition of the council is as follows:

Parishes
Bagworth and Thornton, Barlestone, Barwell (Re-created in 2007), Burbage
Cadeby, Carlton
Desford
Earl Shilton (a town council)
Groby
Higham on the Hill
Market Bosworth, Markfield
Nailstone,	Newbold Verdon
Osbaston
Peckleton (including the villages of Kirkby Mallory and Stapleton)
Ratby
Shackerstone, Sheepy, Stanton-under-Bardon, Stoke Golding, Sutton Cheney
Twycross
Witherley

Arms

References

External links
Hinckley and Bosworth Borough Council's Website
Hinckley Past and Present
The Burbage carnival supports local charities every year

 
Non-metropolitan districts of Leicestershire
Boroughs in England